Steudner's dwarf gecko (Tropiocolotes steudneri), also commonly known as the Algerian sand gecko and Steudner's pigmy gecko, is a species of lizard in the family Gekkonidae. The species is native to North Africa and the Middle East.

Etymology
The specific name, steudneri, is in honor of Hermann Steudner, who was a naturalist and explorer.

Geographic range
T. steudneri is found in Algeria, Egypt, Ethiopia, Jordan, southeastern Libya, and northern Sudan, and possibly in Iran.

Reproduction
T. steudneri is oviparous.

References

Further reading
Boulenger GA (1885). Catalogue of the Lizards in the British Museum (Natural History). Second Edition. Volume I. Geckonidæ ... London: Trustees of the British Museum (Natural History). (Taylor and Francis, printers). xii + 436 pp. + Plates I–XXXII. (Stenodactylus petersii, new species, pp. 18–19 + Plate III, figures 4–4a; Gymnodactylus steudneri, new combination, p. 34).
Peters W (1869). "Eine Mittheilung über neue Saurier (Chaunolæmus multicarinatus, Tropidolepisma Richardi und Gymnodactylus Steudneri) und Batrachier (Cyclorhamphus fasciatus und Hyla gracilenta)". Monatsberichte der Königlich Preussischen Akademie der Wissenschaften zu Berlin 1869: 786–790. (Gymnodactylus steudneri, new species, pp. 788–789). (in German).
Sindaco R, Jeremčenko VK (2008). The Reptiles of the Western Palearctic. 1. Annotated Checklist and Distributional Atlas of the Turtles, Crocodiles, Amphisbaenians and Lizards of Europe, North Africa, Middle East and Central Asia. (Monographs of the Societas Herpetologica Italica). Latina, Italy: Edizioni Belvedere. 580 pp. .
Trape J-F, Trape S, Chirio L (2012). Lézards, crocodiles et tortues d'Afrique occidentale et du Sahara. Paris: IRD Orstom. 503 pp. . (in French).

steudneri
Reptiles described in 1869
Taxa named by Wilhelm Peters
Reptiles of Africa